Dautphetal is a municipality in Hesse, Germany, and is among the six larger municipalities of the 22 in Marburg-Biedenkopf district.

Geography

The municipality lies in the western part of the district about 37 km east of Siegen and about 15 km west of Marburg in the upper Lahn valley. It is characterized by the Palaeozoic Rhenish Massif (Rheinisches Schiefergebirge). Indeed, this range's foothills from the west meet the Westerwald's from the south and the Rothaargebirge's from the north here. Historically speaking, Dautphetal belongs to the so-called Hessisches Hinterland.

Geology
Since the community is to be found in the Rhenish Massif region, rock from the Palaeozoic Era can be found here. In Dautphetal, common minerals to be found include greywacke, diabases, quartzites, and loam produced by weathering of slate and diabase, but also partly limestone.

The geological zone is known to the Hessian Environmental Atlas (Umweltatlas Hessen) as Dill-Mulde .

Besides the copper ore that can be found here, the municipal area also has deposits of manganese and iron ore.

Natural regions
Dautphetal's municipal area is classified under the German system of natural regions as follows:
The Sackpfeifen foothills (with Wollenberg) (Sackpfeifen-Vorhöhen (mit Wollenberg)) (natural region 332.0) in the area north of the Upper Lahn Valley (Oberes Lahntal) falls under the main unit Ostsauerländer Gebirgsrand. The natural region of the Upper Lahn Valley, 320.2, Bottenhorn Plateau (Bottenhorner Hochflächen, 320.01) as well as the Damshausen Hills (Damshäuser Kuppen, 320.10) belong to the Gladenbach Uplands (Gladenbacher Bergland). The highest mountain in this area is the Nimerich (533 m above sea level) northwest of the constituent community of Dautphe. The lowest point anywhere in the area is found on the river Lahn at Elmshausen, where the elevation is 225 m above sea level. East of the community's municipal lands at Damshausen lies the Rimberg (mountain, 498 m above sea level).

Climate

The Dautphetal area has a warm temperate rainy climate, lying as it does in the northern temperate zone of the middle latitudes. The average daytime temperature in the summer is about 15-16 °C (in the Lahn Valley area about 16-17 °C) and in winter about -1 °C to 1 °C. The average yearly rainfall is about 800–1000 mm in Dautphetal, and in the Buchenau and Elmshausen area about 700–800 mm.

Waterways
The biggest flowing waterway in Dautphetal is the river Lahn. This flows through the northern part of the municipal area from west to east. The smaller river Dautphe flows, just as all the smaller streams in the municipal area do sooner or later, into the Lahn.

Neighbouring communities

Clockwise from the north, the following communities are Dautphetal's neighbours:
The towns of Biedenkopf and Wetter (Hessen), the communities of Lahntal, the towns of Marburg and Gladenbach, the communities of Bad Endbach and Steffenberg as well as the community of Breidenbach. All these communities likewise lie in the Marburg-Biedenkopf district.

Moreover, other centres can be named, such as the former group of homesteads belonging to Mornshausen and known as Die Amelose, and the two former iron ore smelting centres of Carlshütte (part of Buchenau) and Wilhelmshütte (part of Dautphe).

The constituent communities of Dautphe, Friedensdorf and Wilhelmshütte form, with over 4,000 inhabitants, the core of the greater community, which was brought about by the appropriate town planning.

History
The history of the greater community of Dautphetal still is not very long. It came into being only in 1974 with municipal reform, having formerly been a series of 12 independent villages until the Hesse Landtag legislated new municipal divisions. This did not necessarily meet with everyone's approval. Ever since then, some of the communities amalgamated with others under the reform have experienced a kind of "local patriotism" in favour of the old communities.

Constituent communities
Dautphetal's municipal area is divided into 12 constituent communities (Ortsteile)

Rulers

Antiquity and Middle Ages
From finds, it seems likely that the area covered by today's community of Dautphetal was already settled in antiquity as also witnessed by ringwall remains such as those on the Rimberg mountain or on the Hünstein (a megalithic monument). The first mention, however, was the naming of a Mark Dautphe in 791. This community is therefore the oldest documented place in the greater community. It was early on already the site of the Zentgericht, the local court under the local counts. It was the lowest court, but it had within its bailiwick the villages of Allendorf, Buchenau, Damshausen, Dautphe, Elmshausen, Friedensdorf, Holzhausen, Hommertshausen, Mornshausen, Silberg and Wolfgruben (nowadays in Dautphetal) as well as Eckelshausen, Kombach, Katzenbach, Dexbach and Engelbach (nowadays in Biedenkopf).

In Charlemagne's time, the area covered by today's community of Dautphetal belonged to the Oberlahngau (a noble domain). After the local noble line, the Gisonen, died out, the area fell to Thuringia. Under Sophie von Brabant, Ludwig IV's and Saint Elisabeth's daughter, the Hessian counties, which had come to the Thuringian counties through marriage, once more began their own development by 1264, and under their son Henry I grew into the Landgravate of Hesse (Landgrafschaft Hessen). The Lords of Hohenfels, who alongside the Lords of Hollende were regarded as the local lords, had to forsake their rights in 1249 under pressure from Sophie. Hohenfels Castle was razed in 1293. Only meagre ruins are to be seen of it today.

Hesse-Darmstadt and Prussia
Ownership of the domain remained under this line until Philip the Magnanimous's death in 1567, at which time the landgravate was divided among four lines, and the Dautphetal area then belonged to Hesse-Marburg. After its line also died out, Hesse-Kassel (or Hesse-Cassel) and Hesse-Darmstadt then fought over the territory, with the latter under its own landgrave eventually winning out, taking the so-called Hinterland in 1648. As a result of the Austro-Prussian War in 1866, the Biedenkopf district, formed in 1832 and in which lies what is today Dautphetal, was ceded to Prussia. This district was for a short time (1932–33) united with the Dillenburg district before the districts of Biedenkopf and Marburg were made to form the still functioning Marburg-Biedenkopf district in Hesse's 1974 municipal reform.

Population development
What follows is an explanation of the population development of today's community of Dautphetal. What stands out is that the first small surge in population in the time of industrialization comes before another one right after the Second World War which saw the population figure rise by almost 50%. This can be explained by the great number of refugees who came and settled in the area after the war, especially from Hungary. The town sisterhood with Cikó in Hungary came to be not the least because of this. Since peaking in 2002 with 13,000 inhabitants, the figure has been stagnating.

Population figure development1:

1: Figures from before 1974 have outlying centres' figures added.

 Source 1834 - 1967: Historisches Gemeindeverzeichnis für Hessen Heft 1, Die Bevölkerung der Gemeinden 1834 - 1967, Hess. Stat. Landesamt

 Source after 1998: Statistik der Gemeinde Dautphetal

Politics

2006 municipal election

Community representatives were last chosen on 26 March 2006 for a five-year term. The SPD lost two seats while the Freie Wähler ("Free Voters", a citizens' coalition) gained three more and the Bürgerliste Dautphetal ("Dautphetal Citizens' List") lost out utterly. Participation in the election fell by 8.5% from 59.3% in 2001 to 50.8%. Of 9,030 eligible voters, only 4,589 went to the polls. The next municipal election in Hesse will take place in March 2011.

At the last municipal election on 18 March 2001, the result was as seen at left. The number of seats had been reduced from 37 in 1997.

Mayor
The greater community's first mayor in 1974 was Hans Hauswirth (CDU). He led the community for thirty years, leaving office only in 2004. On 21 March of that year, Bernd Schmidt of the Free Voters' Community became Dautphetal's new mayor.

Town partnerships
 Cikó, Hungary, since 1997.
 Diesdorf, Saxony-Anhalt, partnership between Evangelical-Lutheran parishes in the two places.
 Kazan, Russian Tatarstan, partnership between Evangelical-Lutheran parish in Dautphetal and Russian-Evangelical parish in Kazan.

Religion

Institutions
 Evangelical-Lutheran parishes
 Free Evangelical parishes
 Catholic parishes
 New Apostolic Church in Hesse
 Christliche Versammlung ("Christian Assembly")
 Herborn-Dillenburger Werk Ev. Gemeinschaftsverein (Evangelical association)

Economy and infrastructure

The economy in Dautphetal is evenly split between industry and trade, while the services sector is a bit smaller. Historically, the one industry that has grown especially in strength and is particularly well represented is the steel and moulding industry. Although Dautphetal with the Lahn valley and its widespread woodlands offers good potential for recreation and tourism, it has hitherto not been exploited as such. Over the last few years, however, some small development has been seen in this field of endeavour, as witnessed by the membership of the regional Lahn-Dill-Bergland club.

Established enterprises
The greatest employer in the community is the firm Roth Industries GmbH & Co. KG. This worldwide active business has all together more than 1,100 workers. After being founded in 1947 as a simple handicraft business, the firm has steadily grown and is nowadays represented in Europe, North and South America, and even in China. Alongside household products (such as shower partitions), synthetic manufacturing and environmental technology (tank manufacturing), companies in machine building and aggregate manufacture are parts of the conglomerate.

Johnson Controls maintains a location in Friedensdorf. This company makes vehicle fuel tanks and car seats, employing 200 people to do so.

The firm Bamberger, formerly Europe's third-biggest manufacturer of enamelled-steel bathtubs, and with 200 employees one of the biggest firms in the community, was taken over by the Kaldewei company and in 2005 it was broken up.

Planning
In the 2001 Middle Hesse Regional Plan, Dautphetal is designated a low centre in the rural area (in terms of Walter Christaller's Central Place Theory). Dautphe and Friedensdorf, it is said in this plan, are the central communities. Furthermore, the greater community is part of the Marburg - Dautphetal - Biedenkopf - (Bad Laasphe) regional development belt. This belt's job is to open up the region, to make possible an exchange of goods and services between middle centres as well as to connect the region to the high centre of Marburg and to the long-distance transportation network. Building on public transport is thus given special importance.

Moreover, there exists a local transport and population belt, Dautphetal - Gladenbach, with a regional connective function. Together with Biedenkopf and Breidenbach, Dautphetal is described as a commercial hub.

Transport

Highway
The main road in Dautphetal is Federal Highway (Bundesstraße) 62. This interregionally important road leads from eastern North Rhine-Westphalia (Siegen) through Middle Hesse (Dautphetal, Marburg) and East Hesse (Alsfeld, Bad Hersfeld) to Thuringia (Bad Salzungen) thereby fulfilling the function of interregional transportation axis. Across the community's municipal area, it runs east-west, going through Buchenau. Bundesstraße 453, which is only 15 km long, branches off B 62 in the neighbouring community of Biedenkopf, leading in a southerly direction through the centres of Wolfgruben, Dautphe, Mornshausen and Herzhausen on its way to Gladenbach.

The nearest Autobahnen are Bundesautobahn 45 about 30 km away to the west in Dillenburg which goes towards Dortmund in one direction and Frankfurt am Main in the other, Bundesautobahn 485 in the southeast towards Gießen connected by the expresswaylike Bundesstraße 3 at Marburg (about 15 km away), Bundesautobahn 5 about 45 km to the east at Homburg leading to Basel in the south and Hamburg in the north, and Bundesautobahn 49 to the northeast connected by Bundesstraße 3 and leading to Kassel. An extension to this last expressway towards Marburg is planned. However, transport, economic and planning interests on the one hand, and ecological and nature preservation concerns on the other have found themselves at odds, meaning that thus far, no acceptable route has been found for the new roadway.

Local public transportation is afforded by the two regional buslines 481 (RKH line 5301) and 491 (RKH line 5356), as well as by four local bus routes, MR-41, MR-52, MR-55 and MR-57, which are meant to improve connections within the community .

Railway

Local rail transport is afforded by the Obere Lahntalbahn, a Deutsche Bahn line also designated as Line 43 of the Rhine-Main Transport Association, running from Erndtebrück in Siegen-Wittgenstein district to the town of Marburg by way of Bad Laasphe and Biedenkopf and serving the Dautphetal stations of Wilhelmshütte (Lahn), Friedendorf (Lahn) and Buchenau (Lahn). The last two named stations are conveniently placed for the Hesse cross-country bicycle path (Hessischer Radfernweg) R 2.

On weekdays there are 21 journeys between 5:30 and 21:00, on Saturdays 13 between 6:45 and 19:00 and on Sundays 12 between 8:45 and 19:00. All trains allow bicycles.

In Marburg are connections to DB's long-distance rail network.

Air transport
The immediate vicinity has two special airfields at Bad Endbach-Bottenhorn and Eschenburg-Hirzenhain as well as a commercial airfield at Cölbe-Schönstadt. The nearest greater airport is Frankfurt International Airport at  Frankfurt am Main.

Bicycle and hiking trails

Owing to its advantageous location in a low mountain range and its attendant great forests and idyllic dales, the whole region is endowed with a substantial trail network. Its potential, however, was only recognized a few years ago and has been organizationally supported for a short time by the association Lahn-Dill-Bergland e. V.

Public institutions
Friedensdorf has since the 1950s been the site of an electrical substation. There, high-voltage current at 110 kV is stepped down to the middle voltage of 20 kV. After the transformers' useful working life had come to an end, a 20 kV switchgear set and new open-air transformer fields were installed in 1998. The substation is run by E.ON Mitte.

Education
In each of the bigger centres in the community is found a kindergarten. Only Damshausen, Elmshausen and Silberg do not have their own. Holzhausen and Buchenau each also have a primary school, the latter's having had until 2006 an attached orientation programme (Förderstufe) which was discontinued because the class-size threshold was no longer being met.

In Friedensdorf, alongside the Dautphetalschule with its primary school and Hauptschule and Realschule branch, itself with an orientation programme, there is the Burgbergschule, a school for learning and educational help. A school for the educable mentally handicapped with a department for those who also have physical handicaps is located in Hommertshausen. In Wilhelmshütte is found the Jule-Spannagel-Schule for hard to educate youth.

Further schooling such as vocational schools and colleges (or the like) or professional Gymnasien are to be found in the surrounding towns of Marburg, Biedenkopf, Bad Laasphe or Gladenbach.

Technical colleges or universities are found in Marburg (Philipps University of Marburg), Gießen (Justus-Liebig-Universität and University of Applied Sciences Giessen-Friedberg), Kassel (University of Kassel) and Siegen (University of Siegen).

In the field of adult education, the district maintains two branches (Dautphetal and Dautphetal-Holzhausen) of the Volkshochschule Marburg-Biedenkopf.

Social institutions
Alongside many mostly Christian-based institutions like the Blue Cross (Blaues Kreuz), there are many other social institutions in Dautphetal. For one, there is the Seniorenzentrum Dautphetal which serves as a nursing home and a residence for the elderly, and for another, there are the Hinterländer Werkstätten, a recognized workshop for the handicapped. The Evangelical spiritual guidance centre help center e.V. has set itself the goal of helping youth in crisis on the basis of Christian belief.

Media
In Dautphetal, the Oberhessische Presse and the Hinterländer Anzeiger are the two daily newspapers, with the latter taking the greater part of the market share. A local section for the old district of Biedenkopf is published by the Oberhessische Presse from Marburg. Furthermore, there is a whole range of advertising flyers such as Hinterland extra from the Oberhessische Presse, the MAZ (Mittelhessische Anzeigen Zeitung, or Middle Hesse Advertising Newspaper) or the Sonntag Morgenmagazin ("Sunday Morning Magazine") from publishing houses in Gießen.

Culture and sightseeing

Museums

In the community of Friedensdorf, the "Old Church" (Alte Kirche) has a weaving room, old photographs and a dialectal archive to visit. From time to time, there are also special exhibits.

The Heimatmuseum Altes Rathaus at the old town hall in Buchenau shows exhibits particularly having to do with household and kitchen, especially from the 1920s to the 1950s.

In the Mini-Museum  „Backes Stibbcher“ in Dautphe, visitors can see a petit-bourgeois 3-room flat from the turn of the twentieth century housing typical exhibits from Dautphe's local history. Moreover, there are exhibits of Dautphe costume and old documents (photographs, maps, registers, family chronicles of Dautphe's oldest families, etc.).

Clubs
The community of Dautphetal harbours an unusually high number of clubs. Near each centre, alongside the well over 30 sport clubs dealing in everything from football to tennis, gymnastics, riding, motor sports and even balloon flying, are a trombone choir and men's or women's choirs. There are moreover, of course, other music clubs such as singing clubs, a Jägerchor ("hunters' choir") or a brass band. The more than 12,000 inhabitants therefore have all together "almost 50 dance and music clubs" to choose from. In the field of animal, breeding or protection clubs, many fowl breeding as well as nature preservation and gardening clubs can be named. Last but not least, more than 40 culture- or homeland-related clubs are at the community's disposal.

Buildings

Most constituent communities' cores are made up of half-timbered houses. Sometimes there are also little half-timbered churches preserved, such as the ones in Hommertshausen and Silberg. The Kratzputzfachwerkhäuser in Holzhausen am Hünstein, half-timbered houses with pargeting (etched plasterwork), are actually protected monuments.

At the summit of the Rimberg stands the 24-m tall Rimberg Tower, dedicated on 30 April 1977. It is already the second tower to stand there, the last one having fallen victim to stormy weather. On a clear day there is a marvellous view, indeed a 360° panorama.

The Carlshütte was built in 1844 as ironworks, and is likewise a protected monument. It came into being as a result of industrialization and its advantageous location between the Lahn, which delivered its energy and the nearby iron ore deposits.

Other buildings:
Historic church (Martinskirche) in Dautphe
Wehrkirche (church built to look like a fortification) in Buchenau

Regular events
Along with the many events organized by local village fraternities and sororities (Burschenschaften and Mädchenschaften), the Christmas Market in Buchenau has grown to quite a size. A particular high point is the Grenzgangsfest, held every seven years in Buchenau and relating to an old custom that centuries ago was designed to limit encroachment on the village's woodlands by neighbouring communities. The next Grenzgangsfest is in 2020.

Personalities

Sons and daughters of the town
 Albrecht Ohly (1829–1891), Mayor of Darmstadt (1874–1891)
 Dieter Trautwein (1928–2002), Evangelical theologian and songwriter

Literature
  Huth, Karl: Dautphe: Herz einer geschichtlichen Kulturlandschaft, Dautphe: Gemeindevorstand der Gemeinde Dautphe 1973
  Huth, Karl: Verwaltungsgeschichte des Landkreises Biedenkopf, Biedenkopf: Kreisausschuss des Landkreises  1957

References

 Umweltatlas Hessen. In: Hessisches Landesamt für Umwelt und Geologie 2005, [01.02.2006]
 Regionalplan Mittelhessen - Textteil (pdf). In: Hessisches Ministerium für Wirtschaft, Verkehr und Landesentwicklung 2006, [01.02.2006]
 Regionaler Nahverkehrsverband. In: Landkreis Marburg-Biedenkopf  2006, [01.02.2006]

External links

 Official website
 private homepage about Allendorf
 private homepage about Holzhausen Hünstein
 Homepage about Mornshausen
 

Marburg-Biedenkopf